Delta Holding is a Serbian holding company with the headquarters in Belgrade. Delta Holding performs a variety of services, such as agribusiness, real estate and wholesale. It employs around 3,600 people, making it one of the largest non-government employers in the country. The founder and president of Delta Holding is Miroslav Mišković.

History
Delta Holding was founded on 4 February 1991 in Belgrade.

In March 2011, Delta Holding sold its largest subsidiary and biggest Serbian supermarket chain Maxi, to the Belgian Delhaize Group for 932.5 million euros. In May 2014, Assicurazioni Generali bought the remaining shares of the second-largest Serbian insurance company "Delta Generali".

In February 2016, Delta City shopping malls in Belgrade and Podgorica were sold to the South African Hyprop Investments Ltd for 202.5 million euros. As of 31 December 2017, Delta Holding has 55 subsidiary companies (divided in four divisions), of which 17 are headquartered outside Serbia.

In March 2019, Delta Holding opened shopping malls in Banja Luka and Varna, in which 190 million euros was invested. In April 2019, Delta Holding's subsidiary company "Autokomanda" bought for 4.2 million euros a location for future shopping mall in Autokomanda neighborhood.

Divisions

Delta Holding has 55 companies within its holding and a total of four divisions (and foundation), each one serving a different purpose. The divisions are as follows:

Delta Agrar Group - Agribusiness - the largest division of Delta Holding. This division operates in the agribusiness activities include agricultural production, processing, distribution and marketing. As of January 2016, Delta Agrar manages around 14,500 hectares of agriculture land (around 145 square kilometers) in Serbia.
Delta Food Processing
Danubius Novi Sad
Yuhor Jagodina
Gala Mioni Mionica
Fun&Fit Zemun
Delta Real Estate Group - Real estate
Delta Real Estate
Shopping Malls
Hotels and offices - Crowne Plaza Belgrade, Park Hotel, Belexpocentar, HolidayInn
Delta Distribution - Wholesale
Delta DMD
Delta Transport Systems (DTS)
Delta Automoto
Delta Motors
Delta Foundation

References

External links

 

 
Companies based in Belgrade
D.o.o. companies in Serbia
Holding companies established in 1991
Holding companies of Serbia
Serbian companies established in 1991